Joseph Ware may refer to:

 Joseph Ware (cricketer) (1822–1868), English cricketer
 Joseph F. Ware Sr. (1880–1969), professor of military science and tactics
 Joe Ware (baseball) (1913–1994), American Negro league baseball player
 Joseph F. Ware Jr. (1916–2012), flight test engineer